Grain in Ear is a 2005 Chinese film written and directed by Korean Chinese filmmaker Zhang Lu. The title refers to the solar term in the traditional calendars of China and Korea.

Plot
Cui Shun-ji is a Chinese woman of Korean ancestry. A single mother bringing up a young son, she lives away from her hometown, and makes a living by selling kimchi. In the course of living her life, she meets three men who betray her. When her son dies in an accident, she decides to take revenge.

Location
Grain in Ear was filmed in a small industrial town, an area 45 minutes' drive away from Beijing, yet just on the edge of farmland."

Theme
Grain in Ear examines the interplay of sex, economics, social class and race in a newly industrialized Chinese provincial backwater. Korean Chinese are one of the recognized ethnic minorities in China, comprising about 2.7 million citizens. Korean Chinese are spread throughout the country, and their group situation is consequently invisible to other Chinese, though many have difficulties integrating into society. Televised folklore celebrations and popular Korean foods such as the world-famous kimchi serve as one of the few common reminders of Korean Chinese culture for other Chinese. Zhang, in his brutal focus on the challenges of assimilation for his native ethnic group, explains that "his film is essentially anti-terrorist. Not at all in the way of Bush’s political agenda, but on the scale of everyday life, how we as humans terrorize those around us."

Festival appearances and awards
2005 Pusan International Film Festival: New Currents Awards
2005 Cannes Film Festival: The 44th International Critics' Week, Prix ACID du meilleur
2005 Pesaro Film Festival: Concorso PNC
2005 Vancouver International Film Festival: Dragons and Tigers
2005 Thessaloniki International Film Festival: International Competition
2005 Osian's - Cinefan, Festival of Asian & Arab Cinema: ASIAN FRESCOES
2005 Chicago International Film Festival: New Directors
2006 San Francisco International Asian American Film Festival
2006 Seattle International Film Festival: New Directors Competition, Special Jury Prize
2006 Vesoul International Film Festival of Asian Cinema: Golden Cyclo Award
2006 International Film Festival Innsbruck: Province of Tyrol Award
2006 Durban International Film Festival: Best Direction, Best Actress
2006 Cinema Novo Festival, Competition: Karibu Award
2006 Barcelona Asian Film Festival: Official Section, Gold Durian Award
2006 Leeds International Film Festival: Official Selection
2006 Brisbane International Film Festival
2006 Film Independent's Los Angeles Film Festival: International Showcase
2006 International Film Festival of Asia Pacific countries in Vladivostok: China in Focus
2006 Mar del Plata International Film Festival: Foreign Visions, Point of View
2006 INDIE LISBOA: Competition
2006 BLACK MOVIE festival de films des autres mondes: Bodies, A Chronicle
2006 Arsenals International Film Forum, KIM & Chi: The South Side
2006 Paris Cinema: New Korean Cinemas

See also
Koreans in China
Chinese cinema
Korean cinema
Korean cuisine
Social realism

References

External links
 
 
 Grain in Ear at the Chinese Movie Database
 

2005 films
2000s Korean-language films
2000s Mandarin-language films
2005 drama films
Films directed by Zhang Lu
Chinese drama films
South Korean drama films
2000s South Korean films